Dark Rain Chronicles is a Maldivian revenge thriller anthology web series directed by Ali Shifau. The series focuses on six stories of ultimate revenge. The first episode titled Assalaam Alaikum featuring Adam Rizwee and Sharaf Abdulla, follows a protective son avenging a scammer for the death of his mother. The second episode titled Fureytha features Aishath Yaadha as a helpless wife committing a heinous crime against her abusive husband.

The third episode Rankolhaa focuses on the sensitive child who has been molested by her step-father and her fruitful revenge years later. The fourth episode titled Surprise narrates a manipulative, wealthy businessman and his revenge on his unfaithful wife. The fifth episode titled Party features Ali Shameel as a drug addict father avenging his son's murder while the last episode of the series Nostalgia narrates the vengeance of a person bullied during childhood.

Cast and characters
Assalaam Alaikum
 Adam Rizwee as Naail
 Sharaf Abdulla as Ahmed
 Mariyam Haleem as Hafeeza Ali; Naail's mother
 Ahmed Mohamed
 Ibrahim Shiyaz as Matheen
 Fathimath Latheefa as Ahmed's mother
 Ahmed Sunie as Matheen's friend

Fureytha
 Ahmed Sunie as Lirar
 Aishath Yaadha as Ainth
 Mohamed Shivaz as Nafiz
 Fathimath Zuhair as Ainth's friend

Rankolhaa
 Ismail Rasheed as Shareef
 Sara Adam as Anoosha
 Vishal Mohamed as Adam
 Fainaz as Areesha
 Adam Rizwee as a customer

Surprise
 Ahmed Saeed as Azee
 Ismail Jumaih as Nadey
 Aminath Aseela as Liu
 Ali Nadheeh as Azee's subordinate

Party
 Ali Shameel as Yasir
 Hamdhoon Farooq as Ahdhu
 Ali Shazleem
 Azmee Adam Naseer
 Ahmed Mohamed 
 Izzak
 Mohamed Naail

Nostalgia
 Ahmed Shakir as Nagidh
 Ahmed Sharif as Riyaz
 Adam Rizwee as a customer

Chapters

Development
On 14 September 2020, on the occasion of Dark Rain Entertainment's fourteenth anniversary, they announced several projects including Dark Rain Chronicles, written and directed by Ali Shifau. Filming for the last episode titled "Nostalgia" commenced on 20 July 2022, which was anticipated to be the pilot episode of the series. During the time, the team announced that the first season will consist of a total of five episodes, later adding another episode to the season. Filming for the second episode titled Fureytha was completed in August 2022.

Release and reception
In August 2022, Dark Rain Entertainment announced that first season consisting six episodes will premiere in October 2022. The series was later pushed for a November release. The first episode of the series titled "Assalaam Alaikum" was released on 12 November 2022 through Baiskoafu. The six episodes of the first season received positive reviews from critics.

References

Serial drama television series
Maldivian television shows
Maldivian web series